Nadia H. Bakhurji is a Saudi architect and businessperson.

Career and education
Bakhurji gained her BSC in Interior Architecture from King Faisal University in 1989. She established the company Riwaq of the Kingdom Est (ROK).

Bakhurji became a founding board member for the Arab International Women's Forum in 2000. She became the first Saudi woman to register as candidate for the Riyadh Local Municipality elections, in 2004, which was subsequently "nullified by Saudi officials" when women's suffrage was banned in Saudi Arabia.

In 2005, she became the first woman to become a member of the board of the Saudi Council of Engineers. She was recognized in the 11th Middle East Women Leaders Awards in 2012.

In 2007, she founded Nadia Bakhurji Architectural and Interior Design Consultants in Riyadh.

Personal life
Bakhurji is the eldest of the 7 siblings.

References

External links
 Nadia Bakhurji Pledges to Back Women Engineers
 Saudi Women Banned From Vote
Personal Webpage

21st-century Saudi Arabian engineers
21st-century women engineers
King Faisal University alumni
Living people
Saudi Arabian women architects
Saudi Arabian women engineers
Year of birth missing (living people)
Place of birth missing (living people)
Saudi Arabian civil engineers